Exilioidea rectirostris is a species of sea snail, a marine gastropod mollusk in the family Ptychatractidae.

Description

Distribution

References

 Dall, W.H. (1908b) Descriptions of new species of mollusks from the Pacific Coast of the United States, with notes on other mollusks from the same region. Proceedings of the United States National Museum, 34, 245–257
 Turgeon, D.; Quinn, J.F.; Bogan, A.E.; Coan, E.V.; Hochberg, F.G.; Lyons, W.G.; Mikkelsen, P.M.; Neves, R.J.; Roper, C.F.E.; Rosenberg, G.; Roth, B.; Scheltema, A.; Thompson, F.G.; Vecchione, M.; Williams, J.D. (1998). Common and scientific names of aquatic invertebrates from the United States and Canada: mollusks. 2nd ed. American Fisheries Society Special Publication, 26. American Fisheries Society: Bethesda, MD (USA). . IX, 526 + cd-rom pp. (look up in IMIS)
page(s): 93
 Talmadge, R. R. 1971. The benthic Mollusca, Plicifusus, in California. Veliger, 14: 42–44
 Bouchet Ph., Warén A. 1988. Transfer of Exilioidea Grant & Gale, 1931 to Turbinellidae, with descriptions of three new species (Neogastropoda). Venus, 47(3): 172–184

External links

Ptychatractidae
Gastropods described in 1864